Walo was a kingdom on the lower Senegal River in West Africa, in what are now Senegal and Mauritania. It included parts of the valley proper and areas north and south, extending to the Atlantic Ocean. To the north were Moorish emirates; to the south was the kingdom of Cayor; to the east was Jolof.

Waalo had a complicated political and social system, which has a continuing influence on Wolof culture in Senegal today, especially its highly formalized and rigid caste system. The kingdom was indirectly hereditary, ruled by three matrilineal families: the Logar, the Tedyek, and the Joos, all from different ethnic backgrounds. The Joos were of Serer origin. This Serer matriclan was established in Waalo by Lingeer Ndoye Demba of Sine. Her grandmother Lingeer Fatim Beye is the matriarch and early ancestor of this dynasty. These matrilineal families engaged in constant dynastic struggles to become "Brak" or king of Waalo, as well as warring with Waalo's neighbors. The royal title "Lingeer" means queen or royal princess, used by the Serer and Wolof.

Waalo was founded in 1287. The semi-legendary figure NDiadiane Ndiaye, was from this kingdom. The mysterious figure went on to rule the Jolof Empire. Under Ndiadian Ndiaye, Jolof made Waalo a vassal.

The royal capital of Waalo was first Ndiourbel (Guribel) on the north bank of the Senegal River (in modern Mauritania), then Ndiangué on the south bank of the river. The capital was moved to Nder on the west shore of the Lac de Guiers. Waalo was subject to constant raids for slaves not only from the Moors but also in the internecine wars.

The Brak ruled with a kind of legislature, the Seb Ak Baor, over a complicated hierarchy of officials and dignitaries. Women had high positions and figured prominently in the political and military history.

Waalo had lucrative treaties with the French, who had established their base at the island of Saint-Louis (now Saint-Louis, Senegal) near the mouth of the river. Waalo was paid fees for every boatload of gum arabic or slaves that was shipped on the river, in return for its "protection" of the trade.

Eventually, this protection became ineffective. Vassals of Waalo, like Beetyo (Bethio), split off. In all, Waalo had 52 kings since its founding.

Waalo had its own traditional African religion. The ruling class was slow to accept Islam, which had spread in the valley; the Brak converted only in the 19th century.

Kings of Waalo

Names and dates taken from John Stewart's African States and Rulers (1989).

References 

 Translation from German Wikipedia: de:Waalo
 WORLD STATESMEN.org Senegal Traditional States
 Présentation du pays at the website of the national office of statistics, La République Islamique de Mauritanie : www.ons.mr.
 Ndete Yalla, dernière reine du Walo (Sénégal). Extrait du portrait de cette reine sénégalaise du 19e siècle que nous dresse Sylvia Serbin dans son ouvrage « Reines d’Afrique et héroïnes de la diaspora noire » (Editions Sépia) Par Sylvia Serbin.
 NDIOURBEL: Première capital du Waalo in Sites et Monuments historiques du Senegal, Center of Resources for the Emergence of Social Participation, Senegal.

Bibliography 
 Barry, Boubacar. Le Royaume du Waalo Le Sénégal avant la Conquête" François Maspéro. 393 pages. Paris 1972.
 Barry, Boubacar. ’The Subordination of Power and Mercantile Economy: The Kingdom of Waalo 1600-1831 "in The Political Economy of Under-Development, Dependence in Senegal by Rita Cruise O'Brien (Ed.) Sage Series on African Mod. and Dev., Vol. 3. California. pp. 39–63.

Former monarchies of Africa
Countries in precolonial Africa
History of Senegal
History of Mauritania
French West Africa
1855 disestablishments
 States and territories established in 1287